The Honda CRF250L (model designations MD38 and MD44) is a dual-sport motorcycle, part of their CRF series, manufactured for a global market. It was first released in 2012 for the 2013 model year.

It combines a high-efficiency, fuel-injected DOHC single-cylinder counterbalanced engine, and electric starter with a comfortable, neutral seating position, headlight, taillight, turn signals, mirrors, EPA and California Air Resources Board compliant exhaust system.

In 2021 it was replaced by Honda CRF300L. The engine was replaced to be compliant with EURO5 emissions standard.

Revision history

2012–2016 

The original CRF250L was an evolution of the CRF230L incorporating a de-tuned version of the proven engine from the CBR250R (2011) road motorcycle, a redesigned frame, and suspension implementation.

2017 

For the 2017 model year, the CRF250L continued to compete with the other 250cc dual-sport motorcycles. There were two additional models the CRF250LA (ABS) and the CRF250L Rally. The ABS can be deactivated quickly via a handlebar button.

Along with the Rally, the standard model took on the following changes; the engine gained a larger throttle body, new muffler design, revised PGM-FI and airbox, and a larger diameter exhaust header, which increased the engine output by 2HP over the earlier design. Styling changes include a revised speedometer with an rpm counter (tachometer), a folding gear lever, and a changed tail light, and the graphics were also changed to fall in line with the new CRF450R MX bike.

Inspired by the factory CRF450 Rally machine raced in the Dakar by Team HRC, the CRF250L Rally gets the same updated engine as the standard 250L, but it also gets a larger fuel tank, totally new Dakar-style bodywork, handguards, a floating windscreen, skid plate, and even more suspension travel.

2021 

For the 2021 model year, the CRF300L and CRF300 Rally replaced the 250 versions.

Changes included the increase in capacity, weight reduction, front-end geometry, and increased fuel capacity (Rally only).

Differences between L and Rally versions 

The bikes share most of the parts, but there are some obvious differences and some incompatibilities that may be surprising. The Rally version has a completely different optic block, windshield, fairing, and a larger tank. The seat looks very similar, but due to the tank differences, it is not compatible with Lversion. The suspension is also different, the 250 Rally has different travel than the 250L.

While a few parts are compatible between the 250 and 300 versions, many are different. Even neutral parts like rear luggage racks are not compatible due to differences in the mount points.

Specifications

References 

CRF250L
Off-road motorcycles
Dual-sport motorcycles
Motorcycles introduced in 2013